Old Town, Tennessee may refer to:
the former settlement of Hardinville, Tennessee, which by the outbreak of the U.S. Civil War had been renamed Old Town
any of the three places described in Old Town (Franklin, Tennessee)